The 2016 Ladies European Tour was a series of golf tournaments for elite female golfers from around the world, which took place from February through December 2016. The tournaments were sanctioned by the Ladies European Tour (LET).

Schedule
The table below shows the 2016 schedule. The numbers in brackets after the winners' names indicate the career wins on the Ladies European Tour, including that event, and is only shown for members of the tour.

Key

Order of Merit rankings

Source:

See also
2016 LPGA Tour

References

External links
Official site of the Ladies European Tour
Ladies European Tour Information Centre

Ladies European Tour
Ladies European Tour
Ladies European Tour